Holland-class may refer to one of these ship classes:

  A group of the United States S-class submarine (Holland-Type)
 , a class of six protected cruisers of the Royal Netherlands Navy
 , a class of four destroyers of the Royal Netherlands Navy
 , a class of offshore patrol vessels for the Royal Netherlands Navy 
 , a class of five submarines of the Royal Navy

See also
 Holland-class submarine (disambiguation)
 Halland-class destroyer